was a town located in Miyazaki District, Miyazaki Prefecture, Japan.

As of 2003, the town had an estimated population of 28,937 and the density of 605.25 persons per km². The total area was 47.81 km².

On March 23, 2010, Kiyotake was merged into the expanded city of Miyazaki and no longer exists as an independent municipality. Miyazaki District was dissolved as a result of this merger.

References

External links
 Miyazaki City official website 

Dissolved municipalities of Miyazaki Prefecture